This list is about Malmö FF players with at least 100 league appearances. For a list of all Malmö FF players with a Wikipedia article, see Category:Malmö FF players. For the current Malmö FF first-team squad, see First-team squad.

Malmö Fotbollförening, also known simply as Malmö FF, is a Swedish professional association football club based in Malmö. The club is affiliated with Skånes Fotbollförbund (The Scanian Football Association), and plays its home games at Stadion. Formed on 24 February 1910, Malmö FF is the most successful club in Sweden in terms of trophies won. The club have won the most league titles of any Swedish club with twenty-one, a joint record eighteen Swedish championship titles and a record fourteen national cup titles. The team competes in Allsvenskan as of the 2015 season; this is Malmö FF's 15th consecutive season in the top flight, and their 80th overall. The main rivals of the club are Helsingborgs IF, IFK Göteborg and, historically, IFK Malmö. Since playing their first competitive match, more than 480 players have made a league appearance for the club, of whom 90 players have made at least 100 appearances; those players are listed here.

Defender Krister Kristensson is the player with the most league appearances in the club's history, having made 348 appearances between 1963 and 1978, scoring seven goals. Kristensson also played for the Sweden national football team, and ended his career with 38 international caps. Forward Hans Håkansson is the player who has scored the most goals in league matches for Malmö FF, with 163 goals in 192 matches; Bo Larsson holds the record of most goals scored in Allsvenskan with 119 goals in the league.

Key

General
League appearances and goals are for first-team competitive league matches only, including Allsvenskan, Svenska Serien, Superettan and Division 2 matches. Substitute appearances included. Total appearances and goals are for first-team matches only, including all competitive and friendly matches.
Players are listed according to the total number of league games played, the player with the most goals scored is ranked higher if two or more players are tied.
Positions are listed according to the tactical formations that were employed at the time. Thus the change in the names of defensive and midfield reflects the tactical evolution that occurred from the 1960s onwards. The year 1960 is used as a breaking point in this list for the use of names of defensive and midfield positions.

Table headers
 Nationality – If a player played international football, the country/countries he played for are shown. Otherwise, the player's nationality is given as their country of birth.
 Malmö FF career – The year of the player's first appearance for Malmö FF to the year of his last appearance.
 League appearances – The number of games played in league competition.
 League goals – The number of goals scored in league competition.
 Total appearances – The number of games played in all games for the club including friendlies.
 Total goals – The number of goals scored in all games for the club including friendlies.

Players
Statistics correct as of match played 14 December 2019.

Club captains 

Since 1940, 30 players have held the position of club captain for Malmö FF. The first club captain was Sture Mårtensson, who was captain from 1940 to 1949. Mårtensson is also the longest-serving captain. Krister Kristensson, who was captain from 1970 to 1978, has the distinction of having won the most trophies as captain; he won five Allsvenskan titles and four Svenska Cupen titles. The current club captain is midfielder Anders Christiansen who has held the captaincy since the beginning of the 2020 season.

Footnotes

References

 
Players
Lists of association football players by club in Sweden
Association football player non-biographical articles